Druid Heights was a bohemian community in Marin County, California, USA, founded in 1954 by poet Elsa Gidlow, her partner Isabel Quallo, and carpenter Roger Somers. The community was a popular retreat for various countercultural movements and a meeting place for many figures of the San Francisco Renaissance.

Mission

Druid Heights was a bohemian community on the southeast flank of Mount Tamalpais in Marin County, California, about a mile from the Pacific Ocean.  It was founded by carpenter Roger Somers and poet Elsa Gidlow, along with their partners, on five acres of a former chicken ranch. Elsa gave the acreage the name Druid Heights in honor of two female writers, the revolutionary and teacher of Irish lore, Ella Young (the Druid), and Emily Brontë (author of Wuthering Heights).

The community was a popular retreat and meeting place for three countercultural movements in the United States, including the Beat Generation of the 1950s, the hippie movement of the 1960s, and the women's movement of the 1970s. It also, through the efforts of Elsa Gidlow, became a meeting place for many famous figures of the San Francisco Renaissance including her friends Kenneth Rexroth and former resident of the heights, Pulitzer Prize winner Gary Snyder.

Located above Muir Woods National Monument, Druid Heights was acquired by the National Park Service in the 1970s and is now on the National Register of Historic Places.

History

Poet Elsa Gidlow and her partner Isabel Quallo, along with carpenter Roger Somers and his wife Mary, started Druid Heights in 1954.  Accessible by a dirt road connected to Muir Woods Road, Druid Heights occupied a five-acre ranch formerly known as the Haapa Property. Somers, a free spirited and hard working craftsman, was influenced by Japanese architecture and American architect Frank Lloyd Wright. He built many of the structures with the help of organizational skills and common sense from furniture designer Ed Stiles. Gidlow was fond of decorative gardening and organic agriculture, and she grew vegetables for the people in the community.

The Society For Comparative Philosophy, begun in 1962, was established here as a non-profit by Elsa Gidlow and Alan Watts aiming for a broad vision approach to "studies of humanity's relation to nature and the universe." They purchased the converted ferry boat Vallejo to "be headquarters for the Society and site of seminars and other events," and the Heights could therefore be kept a closely guarded secret enjoyed by insiders and invited guests. The Society fell on hard times after the 1973 death of Alan Watts, but in his name and with the help of a solid board of directors, it revived and continued until Gidlow's death in 1987.

Gidlow had planned to turn Druid Heights into a retreat for artists, but after the National Park Service acquired the land using eminent domain in 1977, it could no longer host temporary guests, only legal tenants.

Buildings and structures

There are approximately 16 historic buildings and structures in Druid Heights with the most important structure, poet Elsa Gidlow's own house, seriously endangered due to a lack of maintenance. Remaining structures include:

Cloud Hidden, a large rock named by Alan Watts.
The Library, constructed in 1972 out of a redwood water tank, initially to house the books and papers of Alan Watts.
Mandala House, a cabin shaped like a lotus flower. It was originally built by Stiles for Elsa Gidlow's sister, then improved and rented to Alan and Jano Watts from 1970 until his death there in 1973.
The Goddess Meditation hut with stained glass windows.
Love Garden, filled with plants brought there by Gidlow from her other house, 'Madrona' in Fairfax, California and tended by Gidlow with the help of countless friends.
Water Tank, installed under the supervision of Edward Stiles to hold water pumped from the creek for the benefit, communally, of the 12 residents.
The Ranch or Twin Peaks House, was originally a small house built in early 1920s by Alfons Haapa. After the purchase of the Haapa property by Gidlow and Roger and Mary Somers in 1954, Somers’ extensive remodeling and additions radically remade this house by incorporating elements of Japanese, Polynesian and Modern Architecture.
The Old Chicken Barn, built to house chickens by Alfons Haapa in 1943, was converted by Roger Somers and his tenant sculptor Jerry Walter into a combination art studio and dwelling in the late 1950s. After the arrival of the Stiles family in 1965, Ed Stiles continued to remodel and add to this building, including the bathroom’s incorporation of a custom redwood tub and shower.

Residents
Robert Erickson
Elsa Gidlow
Echo Heron
Isabel Quallo
Gary Snyder
Roger Somers
Ed Stiles
Margo St. James
Alan Watts
David Wills

See also
Redwood Creek

References

Further reading

Furlong, Monica (1986) Genuine Fake: A Biography of Alan Watts. Heinemann. .
Liberatore, Paul (November 27, 2011). "Study says Marin's Druid Heights qualifies as a national historic site". Marin Independent Journal.
Silber, Judy (September 19, 2012). "Inside Druid Heights, a Marin County counter-culture landmark". Crosscurrents. KALW.
Toivonen, Michael (March 4, 2018). "A Walk Through Druid Heights". 
Brown, Patricia Leigh (January 25, 2012). "Oasis For Resisting Status Symbols Just Might Get One". New York Times.
New York Times slide show. (January 25, 2012). "Druid Heights, a Once-Thriving Bay Area Bohemia".  New York Times.
Silverstein, Nikki. (January 19, 2021). "Advocates Push to Preserve Historic Druid Heights Community". The Pacific Sun.

Mount Tamalpais
History of Marin County, California
National Park Service National Monuments in California
1950s in California
1960s in California
1970s in California
Artist colonies
Art in the San Francisco Bay Area
Buildings and structures in Marin County, California
1954 establishments in California
Beat Generation
Utopian communities in California
Geography of Marin County, California